2NCR is amongst the earliest licensed non-metropolitan FM community radio stations in New South Wales, Australia.

Originally, the licence was issued to the nearby Northern Rivers College of Advanced Education, however with the re-structure of the university system in the late 1990s, the university became a campus of the newly established Southern Cross University. This new university was not interested in maintaining its broadcast licence - thus a new association was formed to take over control of the community licence. This association was North Coast Radio Inc.

The 2NCR call sign has been used without interruption since inception, and is still the official call sign for the station today. More recently, 2NCR had rebranded to 92.9 FM (2NCR) or 92Nine, and in recent months re-branded to "River-FM".

2NCR / River FM features many community radio program elements, including interview programs, non-English languages, specialist music programs and news. The genre based music programs presented by the station include Blues, Jazz, Indigenous, and country music.

The station's news is provided by the community radio news service National Radio News (or NRN).

Overview
92.9 FM is one of the oldest regional and community radio stations in Australia.

The station has been operating since 1976 and is presently managed by North Coast Radio, Inc., a not-for-profit member based incorporated association.

The station is operated mostly by volunteers, producing programs and program content that overall provides for a diverse range of music tastes, while also providing local news & information and details on local events.

References 

Community radio stations in Australia
Radio stations in New South Wales
Radio stations established in 1976
Lismore, New South Wales